St. Peter's School is a Catholic school located in Waldorf, Maryland. Founded in 1956 by Rev. Henry Sank, it was the first Catholic school in Southern Maryland that was never racially segregated. St. Peter's School is a part of the St. Peter's Catholic Church community and an Archdiocese of Washington Catholic School; it currently offers classes for students from pre-kindergarten through eighth grade.

References

Educational institutions established in 1956
Catholic schools in Maryland
Schools in Charles County, Maryland
1956 establishments in Maryland
Waldorf, Maryland